An Xuan was a Parthian layman credited with working alongside An Shigao and Yan Fotiao in the translation of early Buddhist texts in Luoyang in Later Han China.

Bibliography 
 Nattier, Jan (2008). A Guide to the Earliest Chinese Buddhist Translations: Texts from the Eastern Han and Three Kingdoms Periods, Bibliotheca Philologica et Philosophica, IRIAB Vol. X, 89-94; 

2nd-century Buddhists
Iranian Buddhists
Han dynasty Buddhists
2nd-century Iranian people